Thomas Hayden (23 October 1926 – 25 December 2018), better known as Tommy Hayden, was an Irish weightlifter who competed in the 1960 Summer Olympics. Hayden was a member of the Hercules Weightlifting Club from 1946 and later served as its President. He died in December 2018 at the age of 92.

References

1926 births
2018 deaths
Irish male weightlifters
Olympic weightlifters of Ireland
Weightlifters at the 1960 Summer Olympics
Place of birth missing